Sergei Rachmaninoff composed two piano trios titled Trio élégiaque:

Trio élégiaque No. 1 for piano, violin and cello
Trio élégiaque No. 2 for piano, violin and cello